Kenneth William Hough (24 October 1928 – 20 September 2009) was a cricketer and association football player who represented both New Zealand and Australia in football. He also represented New Zealand in Test cricket. Hough was born in Auburn, a suburb of Sydney, Australia. He died, aged 80, in Gladstone, Queensland.

Cricket career
A right-arm fast bowler and useful lower-order batsman, Hough played two Tests against England in 1958–59 and 28 first-class matches, mostly for Northern Districts and Auckland, in his career.  He took more wickets than anybody else in the 1958–59 Plunket Shield season, with 36 wickets for Auckland at 12.13, including 11 for 93 in the match against Otago and 10 for 110 against Canterbury, to help Auckland to win the championship. He was one of the New Zealand Cricket Almanac's two Players of the Year in 1959. His finest performance was 12 for 146 (7 for 43 and 5 for 103) for Auckland against Central Districts in 1959–60. He played two matches for New Zealand against the Australian team in 1959–60, taking six wickets. They were his last first-class matches.

In the course of his brief career Hough set the Test match record for the most wickets in a complete career (6) without ever dismissing a batsman caught.

Football career
Hough played four matches for the Australian national team in 1948, all against New Zealand.

Hough  made his full debut  for New Zealand between the posts in a 2–3 loss to Australia on 16 August 1958. and made four more appearances over the following month, the last of his A-international caps being in a 2–1 win over New Caledonia on 14 September 1958.

References

External links

1928 births
2009 deaths
Auckland cricketers
Australia international soccer players
Dual internationalists (football)
Association football goalkeepers
New Zealand cricketers
New Zealand association footballers
New Zealand international footballers
Australian emigrants to New Zealand
New Zealand Test cricketers
Northern Districts cricketers
Soccer players from Sydney
North Island cricketers